Cecil O. Creal (19 December 1899 – 20 November 1986) was mayor of Ann Arbor, in the U.S. state of Michigan, from 1959 to 1965.

Life and career

Creal was born in 1899 in Kiantone, Chautauqua County, New York. During World War I, he served in the U.S. Navy. Creal married Dama Godfrey of Ann Arbor in 1925. He was an Episcopalian. Creal had two sons, Richard and Robert.

Under Ann Arbor's old system of municipal governance, Creal served as President of the Ann Arbor Common Council (City Council) for multiple terms. The council president presided at the meetings then. The mayor under that system was more of a ceremonial figurehead, who had power of veto over council decisions, but did not attend the meetings.

Creal ran for Ann Arbor mayor as a Republican in 1959. He defeated Democrat Lloyd M. Ives, and went on to win two more terms, triumphing over Democrats Dorothee S. Pealy in 1961 and Albert F. Schneider in 1963. Creal did not run for a fourth term in 1965.

Creal died in Ann Arbor on November 20, 1986, and is buried at Forest Hill Cemetery. Ann Arbor's Creal Park and Creal Crescent are both named after Mayor Creal.

Sources
Mayors of Ann Arbor page at PoliticalGraveyard.com
Arborweb "Weddings of Yore"
 

1899 births
1986 deaths
United States Navy personnel of World War I
Burials in Michigan
Mayors of Ann Arbor, Michigan
Michigan Republicans
20th-century American politicians
20th-century American Episcopalians